CCIR System C (originally known as the Belgian 625-line system) is an analog broadcast television system used between 1953 an 1978 in Belgium, Italy, Netherlands and Luxembourg as a compromise between Systems B and L. Used on VHF only.

Specifications 
Some of the important specifications for System C are listed below:

Television channels were arranged as follows:

See also 
CCIR System B
CCIR System L
Broadcast television systems
Television transmitter
Transposer

Notes and references

External links 
 World Analogue Television Standards and Waveforms
 Fernsehnormen aller Staaten und Gebiete der Welt

ITU-R recommendations
Television technology
C, System
Broadcast engineering
CCIR System